The PRS Peak is a German single-place paraglider that was designed by Pilots Right Stuff (PRS) in conjunction with Robbie Whittall and Ozone Gliders and produced by Pilots Right Stuff of Brannenburg. It is now out of production.

Design and development
The aircraft was designed as a mountaineering descent glider. Reviewer Noel Bertrand noted in a 2003 review that the Peak "opened up a market for very lightweight Para-Trekking models and several competitors have moved into this market gap."

The models are each named for their relative size.

Variants
Peak S
Small-sized model for lighter pilots. The glider model is DHV 1 certified.
Peak M
Mid-sized model for medium-weight pilots. The glider model is DHV 1 certified.
Peak L
Large-sized model for heavier pilots. The glider model is DHV 1 certified.

Specifications (Peak M)

See also
PRS Pilot One

References

Peak
Paragliders